Xanthodelphax is a genus of true bugs belonging to the family Delphacidae.

The species of this genus are found in Europe.

Species:

Xanthodelphax flaveolus 
Xanthodelphax hellas 
Xanthodelphax optimus 
Xanthodelphax straminea 
Xanthodelphax xantha

References

Delphacidae
Hemiptera genera